Alice in Wonderland may refer to:
Alice's Adventures in Wonderland (also known as Alice in Wonderland for short), the 1865 novel by Lewis Carroll
Through the Looking-Glass, the 1871 sequel

Stage adaptations
 Alice in Wonderland (musical), 1886 musical by Henry Savile Clarke and Walter Slaughter
 Alice in Wonderland, 2006 opera by Peter Westergaard
 Alice in Wonderland (opera), 2007 opera by Unsuk Chin and David Henry Hwang
 Alice's Adventures in Wonderland (ballet) by Christopher Wheeldon (2011)
 Wonderland (musical) 2011 musical with music by Frank Wildhorn and lyrics by Jack Murphy
 Wonder.land, 2015 musical with music by Damon Albarn and lyrics and book by Moira Buffini

Film and television
 Alice in Wonderland (1903 film), silent motion picture
 Alice's Adventures in Wonderland (1910 film), silent motion picture
 Alice in Wonderland (1915 film), silent motion picture
 Alice in Wonderland (1931 film), motion picture
 Alice in Wonderland (1933 film), motion picture
 Alice in Wonderland (1949 film), part live action motion picture
 Alice in Wonderland (1951 film), Disney animated film
 Alice in Wonderland (Kalabis), a 1993 Czech ballet film
 Alice of Wonderland in Paris, 1966 animated movie
 Alice in Wonderland (1966 TV play), made-for-TV film by the BBC
 Alice in Wonderland or What's a Nice Kid like You Doing in a Place like This?, a 1966 animated television special
 Alice's Adventures in Wonderland (1972 film), musical motion picture
 Alice in Wonderland (1976 film), an erotic musical parody film
 Alice in Wonderland (1983 film), TV film based on Broadway play
 Fushigi no Kuni no Alice, 1983 anime adaptation
 Alice in Wonderland (1985 film), made-for-television film
 Alice (1988 film), stop-motion adaptation by Jan Svenkmajer
 Alice in Wonderland (1988 film), animated film
 Adventures in Wonderland, live-action television series
 Alice in Wonderland (1999 film), made-for-television film
 Alice in Wonderland (2005 film), Malayalam-language film
 Alice (miniseries) (2009), a modern interpretation TV miniseries broadcast on Syfy
 Alice in Wonderland (2010 film), Disney film directed by Tim Burton
 Once Upon a Time in Wonderland, a 2013 ABC spin-off of the TV series Once Upon a Time
 Alice Through the Looking Glass (2016 film), a 2016 sequel of the 2010 Disney film
 Alice's Wonderland Bakery

Music
Alice in Wonderland (Alice Nine album), 2005 album by Japanese rock band Alice Nine
Alice in Wonderland (K3 album) (2011), or the title song
"Alice in Wonderland" (song), the theme song to the 1951 film which has become a jazz standard
"Alice in Wonderland", a song from Brian McFadden's 2008 album Set in Stone
"Alice in Wonderland", a song written by Irving Berlin
Alison Wonderland, an Australian DJ and producer

Other uses
 Miyuki-chan in Wonderland, 1995, manga series
 American McGee's Alice, 2000, computer game
 Alice in Wonderland (1985 video game), for Apple II and Commodore 64
 Alice in Wonderland (2000 video game), a Game Boy Color game published by Nintendo.
 Alice in Wonderland (2010 video game), a multi-platform game based on Tim Burton's Alice in Wonderland
 Alice 19th, manga by Yū Watase
 Alice in Wonderland (Disneyland attraction)
 Alice in Wonderland (franchise)
 Alice in Wonderland syndrome, disorienting hallucinatory condition

See also
Alice (disambiguation)
Wonderland (disambiguation)

Films and television programmes based on Alice in Wonderland
Works based on Alice in Wonderland

External links